Glenn Naunton Davies (born 1950) is a retired Australian Anglican bishop. Since August 2022 he has served as bishop of the Diocese of the Southern Cross, an Anglican diocese set up outside of the Anglican Church of Australia. He previously served as the Archbishop of Sydney and Metropolitan of the Province of New South Wales in the Anglican Church of Australia from 23 August 2013 to 26 March 2021.

Early life and education
Davies was born on 26 September 1950. He was educated at Shore School, the University of Sydney, Westminster Theological Seminary, Moore Theological College and the University of Sheffield.

Ordained ministry
Davies was ordained in 1981 and began his ordained ministry as a curate at St Stephen's, Willoughby. He was then a lecturer at Moore Theological College until 1995 and rector of St Luke's, Miranda. He has been the canon theologian of the Diocese of Ballarat.

Davies was the Bishop of the North Region (of Sydney) from 2002 to 2014.

In 2013, he was nominated by 182 members of synod for Archbishop of Sydney. He was subsequently elected and became the archbishop-elect on 6 August 2013. His installation service was held on 23 August 2013.

In October 2019, in his presidential address to the synod of the Diocese of Sydney, Davies advised those who wanted to change the doctrine of the Anglican Church of Australia to allow the blessing of same-sex marriage to leave the church. These comments were criticised by some within the church who want it to be more inclusive. In response, Davies indicated that his comments were directed at those who wanted to change church doctrine and not to members of congregations or those who identified as gay.

On 15 August 2022, it was announced that Glenn Davies would be the first bishop of the new Diocese of the Southern Cross set up by GAFCON Australia.

Publications
Davies is the author of Faith and Obedience in Romans (1989, Sheffield Academic Press) as well as numerous journal articles and essays.

Personal life
Davies is a recipient of the Centenary Medal.

References

1950 births
Living people
University of Sydney alumni
Alumni of the University of Sheffield
Moore Theological College alumni
Academic staff of Moore Theological College
Recipients of the Centenary Medal
21st-century Anglican bishops in Australia
21st-century Anglican archbishops
Anglican archbishops of Sydney
Assistant bishops in the Anglican Diocese of Sydney
Evangelical Anglican bishops
Westminster Theological Seminary alumni
Anglican realignment people